Vaughan Arnell (born 31 May 1961, in Chertsey, Surrey) is a British music video and television commercial director. Although having done films for high-profile clients in the TV commercial field, including Nestlé and Levi's, he is best known for his directorial work for music videos, including George Michael's "Fastlove" (1996), Spice Girls' "Say You'll Be There" (1996), One Direction's "Kiss You" (2013), and Sam Smith and Normani's "Dancing with a Stranger" (2019). He is also a frequent collaborator of music artist Robbie Williams. Arnell was a member of the directorial team Vaughan & Anthea (with Anthea Benton).

Videography
 Dead or Alive – You Spin Me Round (Like a Record) (1984) (co-directed with Anthea Benton)
 Dead or Alive – Brand New Lover (1986) (co-directed with Anthea Benton)
 Curiosity Killed the Cat – Down to Earth (1986)
 Terence Trent D'Arby – Dance Little Sister (1987)
 Julia Fordham – The Comfort of Strangers (1988)
 Terence Trent D'Arby – Wishing Well (1988)
 Terence Trent D'Arby – Sign Your Name (1988)
 The Pasadenas – Tribute (Right On) (1988)
 Matt Bianco – Good Times (1988)
 Associates – Fever (1990)
 Eros Ramazzotti – Se bastasse una canzone (1990)
 Propaganda – Heaven Give Me Words (1990)
 Soul II Soul – Move Me No Mountain (1992)
 Jamiroquai – Space Cowboy (1994) (co-directed with Anthea Benton)
 Take That – Back for Good (1995)
 George Michael – Fastlove (1996) (co-directed with Anthea Benton)
 George Michael – Spinning the Wheel (1996) (co-directed with Anthea Benton)
 Spice Girls – Say You'll Be There (1996)
 Tevin Campbell – Could You Learn to Love (1997)
 Jamiroquai – Alright (1997)
 Jimmy Ray – Are You Jimmy Ray? (1997)
 Robbie Williams – Angels (1997)
 Robbie Williams – Let Me Entertain You (1998)
 All Saints – Bootie Call (1998)
 Robbie Williams – Millennium (1998)
 George Michael – Outside (1998)
 Geri Halliwell – Look at Me (1999)
 21st Century Girls – 21st Century Girls (1999)
 All Saints – Pure Shores (2000)
 The Charlatans – Impossible (2000)
 Robbie Williams – Rock DJ (2000)
 Texas – In Demand (2000)
 Texas – Inner Smile (2000)
 Robbie Williams – Supreme (2000)
 Robbie Williams – The Road to Mandalay (2001)
 Robbie Williams – Eternity (2001)
 Robbie Williams & Nicole Kidman – Somethin' Stupid (2001)
 Blazin' Squad – Crossroads (2002)
 Big Brovaz – Nu Flow (2002)
 Robbie Williams – Feel (2002)
 David Gray – Be Mine (2003)
 Big Brovaz – Baby Boy (2003)
 Robbie Williams – Radio (2004)
 Charlotte Church – Crazy Chick (2005)
 Will Young – Switch It On (2005)
 Robbie Williams – Sin Sin Sin (2006)
 Paloma Faith – New York (2009)
 Robbie Williams – Bodies (2009)
 Robbie Williams & Gary Barlow – Shame (2010)
 One Direction – Live While We're Young (2012)
 One Direction – Little Things (2012)
 Olly Murs – Army of Two (2013)
 One Direction – Kiss You (2013)
 John Newman – Love Me Again (2013)
 James Blunt – Bonfire Heart (2013)
 Olly Murs – Hand on Heart (2013)
 James Blunt – Heart To Heart (2013)
 George Michael – Let Her Down Easy (2014)
 The Script – Superheroes (2014)
 James Blunt – Postcards (2014)
 James Blunt – When I Find Love Again (2014)
 Elvis Presley with the Royal Philharmonic Orchestra – The Wonder of You featuring Kate Moss (2016)
 Robbie Williams – Party Like a Russian (2016)
 Robbie Williams – The Heavy Entertainment Show (2016)
 James Blunt – Love Me Better (2017)
 Rick Astley – Beautiful Life (2018)
 Sam Smith & Normani – Dancing with a Stranger (2019)
 Pet Shop Boys — Monkey Business (2020)
 James Blunt – Monsters (2020)

Commercials 
 Aviva – Name Change, I Am John
 BBC – If You Love Something
 BT – Getoutthere.com
 Carlsberg – Bank
 ClearScore – Ruby
 Dogs Trust – Corky
 Dreamcast – Shave
 Emirates – Tomorrow
 Eurostar – Cheese, Meeting
 Ford Focus C-Max – Metaphors
 Guinness – Free In
 Home Fire Action Plan – Get Out Alive
 Horlicks – Made For Evenings
 Hostelworld – Charlie Sheen
 House of Fraser – Bring Merry Back, The Blackout
 Ikea – Walkaway
 Impulse – Positive Thoughts
 Justerini & Brooks – Sol's Big Night Out
 Levi's – Creek
 Lexus – Make Waves
 Marks & Spencer – Christmas Wouldn't Be Christmas Without, Dinner, Everybody Dance
 Nescafé – Allotment, Ford Cortina, Wave
 Orange – Group Talk Plans
 Pepsi – Blue Card
 PokerStars – The Game
 Powergen – Boxes
 Range Rover LSE – Thoughts, Afterthoughts
 Rover 45 – Pinball
 Royal Air Force – Payload
 Samaritans – Buckaroo, Dino Hunt, Space Invaders, Table Football
 Sky – Treat Yourself
 Sky VIP – Something Special For Everyone
 Smirnoff – Reflection
 Starlight – Pool
 Stella Artois – Red Shoes
 The Sunday Times – Dury On Life
 Wrangler – DJ

References

External links 
Official site

Serious Picture(s) official site
Vaughan Arnell at Clipland
Vaughan Arnell at mvdb.com

1961 births
British music video directors
People from Chertsey
People from Hammersmith
English music video directors
Living people
Advertising directors